Sivajipalem is a  locality in Visakhapatnam, Andhra Pradesh, India. It is one of the costliest suburbs with high real estate cost both for commercial and residential properties.

Commercial area
There are many small shops in the area. But the choice is great in the neighbouring suburb of MVP Colony.

It is located opposite to National Highway No 16. one of the famous park in Visakhapatnam Sivaji Park

Economy
Real estate and construction contributes to majority of economy.

Transport
The state-owned APSRTC runs the city bus service, connecting to all the major centres of the city.

References

Neighbourhoods in Visakhapatnam